Sphenomorphus meyeri is a species of skink found in Indonesia and Papua New Guinea.

References

meyeri
Reptiles described in 1875
Taxa named by Giacomo Doria
Skinks of New Guinea